The Municipality and Borough of Skagway is a first-class borough in Alaska on the Alaska Panhandle. As of the 2020 census, the population was 1,240, up from 968 in 2010. The population doubles in the summer tourist season in order to deal with more than 1,000,000 visitors each year. Incorporated as a borough on June 25, 2007, it was previously a city (urban Skagway located at ) in the Skagway-Yakutat-Angoon Census Area (now the Hoonah–Angoon Census Area, Alaska). The most populated community is the census-designated place of Skagway.

The port of Skagway is a popular stop for cruise ships, and the tourist trade is a big part of the business of Skagway. The White Pass and Yukon Route narrow gauge railroad, part of the area's mining past, is now in operation purely for the tourist trade and runs throughout the summer months.  Skagway is also part of the setting for Jack London's book The Call of the Wild, Will Hobbs's book Jason's Gold, and for Joe Haldeman's novel, Guardian. The John Wayne film North to Alaska (1960) was filmed nearby.

The name Skagway (historically also spelled Skaguay) is derived from sha-ka-ԍéi, a Tlingit idiom which figuratively refers to rough seas in the Taiya Inlet, which are caused by strong north winds.  (See, "Etymology and the Mythical Stone Woman", below.)

History

Etymology and the Mythical Stone Woman
Skagway was derived from sha-ka-ԍéi, a Tlingit idiom which figuratively refers to rough seas in the Taiya Inlet, that are caused by strong north winds.  Literally, sha-ka-ԍéi is a gerund (verbal noun) which means pretty woman.  The gerund was derived from the Tlingit finite verb theme -sha-ka-li-ԍéi, which means, in the case of a woman, to be pretty.

The story behind the name is that Sha-ka-ԍéi or Skagway [“Pretty Woman”] was the nickname of Kanagoo, a mythical woman who transformed herself into stone at Skagway bay and who (according to the story) now causes the strong, channeled winds which blow toward Haines, Alaska.  The rough seas caused by these winds have therefore been referred to by the use of Kanagoo's nickname, Sha-ka-ԍéi or Skagway.

The Kanagoo stone formation is now known as Face Mountain, which is seen from Skagway bay.  The Tlingit name for Face Mountain is Kanagoo Yahaayí [Kanagoo's Image/Soul].

Early Skagway

One prominent resident of early Skagway was William "Billy" Moore, a former steamboat captain. As a member of an 1887 boundary survey expedition, he had made the first recorded investigation of the pass over the Coast Mountains, which later became known as White Pass. He believed that gold lay in the Klondike because it had been found in similar mountain ranges in South America, Mexico, California, and British Columbia. In 1887, he and his son, J. Bernard "Ben" Moore, claimed a 160-acre (650,000 m2) homestead at the mouth of the Skagway River in Alaska. Moore settled in this area because he believed it provided the most direct route to the potential goldfields. They built a log cabin, a sawmill, and a wharf in anticipation of future gold prospectors passing through.

The boundary between Canada and the United States along the Alaska Panhandle was only vaguely defined then (see Alaska boundary dispute). There were overlapping land claims from the United States' purchase of Alaska from Russia in 1867 and British claims along the coast. Canada requested a survey after British Columbia united with it in 1871, but the idea was rejected by the United States as being too costly, given the area's remoteness, sparse settlement, and limited economic or strategic interest.

The Klondike gold rush changed everything. In 1896, gold was found in the Klondike region of Canada's Yukon Territory. On July 29, 1897, the steamer Queen docked at Moore's wharf with the first boat load of prospectors. More ships brought thousands of hopeful miners into the new town and prepared for the 500-mile journey to the gold fields in Canada. Moore was overrun by lot jumping prospectors and had his land stolen from him and sold to others.

The population of the general area increased enormously and reached 30,000, composed largely of American prospectors. Some realized how difficult the trek ahead would be en route to the gold fields, and chose to stay behind to supply goods and services to miners. Within weeks, stores, saloons, and offices lined the muddy streets of Skagway. The population was estimated at 8,000 residents during the spring of 1898 with approximately 1,000 prospective miners passing through town each week. By June 1898, with a population between 8,000 and 10,000, Skagway was the largest city in Alaska.

Due to the sudden influx of visitors to Skagway, some town residents began offering miners transportation services to aid them in their journeys to the Yukon, often at highly inflated rates. A group of miners upset with the treatment organized a town council to help protect their interests. But as the members of the council moved north to try their own hands at mining, control of the town reverted to the more unscrupulous, most notably Jefferson Randolph "Soapy" Smith.

Between 1897 and 1898, Skagway was a lawless town, described by one member of the North-West Mounted Police as "little better than a hell on earth." Fights, prostitutes and liquor were ever-present on Skagway's streets, and con man "Soapy" Smith, who had risen to considerable power, did little to stop it. Smith was a sophisticated swindler who liked to think of himself as a kind and generous benefactor to the needy. He was gracious to some, giving money to widows and halting lynchings, while simultaneously operating a ring of thieves who swindled prospectors with cards, dice, and the shell game. His telegraph office charged five dollars to send a message anywhere in the world. Consequently, unknowing prospectors sent news to their families back home without realizing there was no telegraph service to or from Skagway until 1901. Smith also controlled a comprehensive spy network, a private militia called the Skaguay Military Company, the town newspaper, the Deputy U.S. Marshal's office and an array of thieves and con-men who roamed about the town. Smith was shot and killed by Frank Reid and Jesse Murphy on July 8, 1898, in the famed Shootout on Juneau Wharf. Smith managed to return fire — some accounts claim the two men fired their weapons simultaneously — and Frank Reid died from his wounds twelve days later. Jesse Murphy is believed by some to be responsible for killing Smith, but the official Coroner’s Inquest ruled that it was Reid’s bullet that did the fatal work. ref></ref>; Inquest Records, 1898-1935, Historic Records of the Office of the Magistrate, City of Skagway, Volume 55, Microfilm 176, Alaska State Archives, Juneau: “Inquest of Jeff R. Smith,” p. 6: “that said Smith [died] by reason of pistol wound piercing the heart. The said wound was the result of a pistol shot fired by one Frank H. Reid.”

Smith and Reid are now interred at the Klondike Gold Rush Cemetery, also known as "Skagway's Boot Hill."

The prospectors' journey began for many when they climbed the mountains over the White Pass above Skagway and onward across the Canada–US border to Bennett Lake, or one of its neighboring lakes, where they built barges and floated down the Yukon River to the gold fields around Dawson City. Others disembarked at nearby Dyea, northwest of Skagway, and crossed northward on the Chilkoot Pass, an existing Tlingit trade route to reach the lakes. The Dyea route fell out of favor when larger ships began to arrive, as its harbor was too shallow for them except at high tide. Officials in Canada began requiring that each prospector entering Canada on the north side of the White Pass bring with him one ton (909 kg) of supplies, to ensure that he did not starve during the winter. This placed a large burden on the prospectors and the pack animals climbing the steep pass.

In 1898, a 14-mile, steam-operated aerial tramway was constructed up the Skagway side of the White Pass, easing the burden of those prospectors who could afford the fee to use it. The Chilkoot Trail tramways also began to operate in the Chilkoot Pass above Dyea. In 1896, before the Klondike gold rush had begun, a group of investors saw an opportunity for a railroad over that route. It was not until May 1898 that the White Pass and Yukon Route began laying narrow gauge railroad tracks in Skagway. The railroad depot was constructed between September and December 1898. This destroyed the viability of Dyea, as Skagway had both the deep-water port and the railroad. Construction of McCabe College, the first school in Alaska to offer a college preparatory high school curriculum, began in 1899. The school was completed in 1900.

By 1899, the stream of gold-seekers had diminished and Skagway's economy began to collapse. By 1900, when the railroad was completed, the gold rush was nearly over. In 1900, Skagway was incorporated as the first city in the Alaska Territory. Much of the history of Skagway was saved by early residents such as Martin Itjen, who ran a tour bus around the historical town. He was responsible for saving and maintaining the gold- rush cemetery from complete loss. He purchased Soapy Smith's saloon (Jeff Smith's Parlor) from going the way of the wrecking ball, and placed many early artifacts of the city's early history inside and opened Skagway's first museum.

In July 1923, President Warren G. Harding visited Skagway while on his historic tour through Alaska. Harding was the first President of the United States to travel and tour Alaska while in office. The Canol pipeline was extended to Skagway in the 1940s where oil was shipped in by sea and pumped north.

Geography

Skagway is located at  (59.468519, −135.305962).

Skagway is located in a narrow glaciated valley at the head of the Taiya Inlet, the north end of the Lynn Canal, which is the most northern fjord on the Inside Passage on the south coast of Alaska. 
It is in the Alaska panhandle 90 miles northwest of Juneau, Alaska's capital city.

It is currently the smallest borough in Alaska, having taken the title away from Bristol Bay Borough at its creation.

Adjacent boroughs
 Haines Borough, Alaska – south, west
 Stikine Region, British Columbia – north, east

National protected areas
 Klondike Gold Rush National Historical Park (part, also in Seattle, Washington)
 Tongass National Forest (part)

Climate
Skagway has a humid continental climate (Köppen Dsb). It is in the rain shadow of the coastal mountains, and though not as pronounced as the rain shadow in Southcentral Alaska in the valley of the Susitna River, this still allows it to receive only half as much precipitation as Juneau and only a sixth as much as Yakutat. Although winters are too cold for the classification, precipitation patterns resemble a mediterranean climate due to the summer precipitation minimum.

North winds prevail at Skagway from November to March.  South winds prevail from April to October.

Demographics

Skagway first appeared on the 1900 U.S. Census, having incorporated as a city that same year. It was the 2nd largest city in Alaska, behind fellow Gold Rush boomtown Nome. It reported 3,117 residents, of which 2,845 were White, 113 were Native Americans, 98 were Black and 61 were Asian. It rapidly declined to 872 residents by 1910, falling to the 8th largest city. It reported 802 Whites, 61 Native Americans and 9 Others. It would be 90 years (until 2000) before it would almost reach that population again (862). It fell to 15th largest community overall in 1920. By 1930, it bottomed out at 492 residents, although it rose to 13th largest in the state. In 1940, it fell to 16th. By 1950, 19th. 1960, it tied for 29th place (16th largest incorporated). In 1970, it dropped to 45th (24th largest incorporated). In 1980, it rose to 35th place. In 1990, it fell to 53rd place. In 2000, it was at 60th place overall (29th largest incorporated). In 2007, with the creation of the Skagway Municipality out of Skagway-Hoonah-Angoon, it ceased to be an incorporated city and became a census-designated place (CDP). As of 2010, it is the 71st largest community in Alaska.

As of the census of 2000, there were 862 people, 401 households, and 214 families residing in the city.  The population density was 1.9 people per square mile (0.7/km2).  There were 502 housing units at an average density of 1.1 per square mile (0.4/km2).  The racial makeup of the city was 92.3% White, 3.0% Native American, 0.6% Asian, 0.2% Pacific Islander, 0.8% from other races, and 3.0% from two or more races.  2.1% of the population were Hispanic or Latino of any race.

There were 401 households, out of which 23.2% had children under the age of 18 living with them, 46.9% were married couples living together, 4.7% had a female householder with no husband present, and 46.4% were non-families. 36.2% of all households were made up of individuals, and 6.7% had someone living alone who was 65 years of age or older.  The average household size was 2.15 and the average family size was 2.81.

In the city, the population was distributed with 20.5% under the age of 18, 5.2% from 18 to 24, 34.6% from 25 to 44, 31.2% from 45 to 64, and 8.5% who were 65 years of age or older.  The median age was 40 years old. For every 100 females, there were 109.2 males.  For every 100 females age 18 and over, there were 112.7 males.

Economy

Personal income
The median income for a household in the city was $49,375, and the median income for a family was $62,188. Males had a median income of $44,583 versus $30,956 for females. The per capita income for the city was $27,700.  About 1.0% of families and 3.7% of the population were below the poverty line, including none of those under age 18 and 4.5% of those age 65 or over.

Tourism

There are visitors to the Klondike Gold Rush National Historical Park and White Pass and Chilkoot Trails. Skagway has a historical district of about 100 buildings from the gold rush era. It receives about a million tourists annually, most of whom (about three quarters) come on cruise ships. The White Pass and Yukon Route operates its narrow-gauge train around Skagway during the summer months, primarily for tourists. The WPYR also ships copper ore from the interior.

Transportation

Skagway is one of three Southeast Alaskan communities that are connected to the road system; Skagway's connection is via the Klondike Highway, completed in 1978. This allows access to the lower 48, Whitehorse, Yukon, northern British Columbia, and the Alaska Highway. This also makes Skagway an important port-of-call for the Alaska Marine Highway — Alaska's ferry system — and serves as the northern terminus of the important and heavily used Lynn Canal corridor. (The other Southeast Alaskan communities with road access are Haines and Hyder.)

The White Pass and Yukon Route is a railway that formerly linked Whitehorse, Yukon in Canada to Skagway, the railway's southernmost terminus. Today, trains travel several times a week from May through September from Skagway to the small community of Carcross, approximately 45 miles south/southwest of Whitehorse. There, passengers (mostly tourists) can make connections via bus to Whitehorse.

Skagway Airport receives service from two bush carriers: Alaska Seaplanes, and Air Excursions.

Media

Local radio and newspapers
Skagway is served by its local semimonthly newspaper, The Skagway News, as well as regional public radio station KHNS, which has its principal studios in nearby Haines but also has studios and programs based in Skagway.  Juneau radio station KINY operates a translator in Skagway which serves the entire town.

Skagway also receives copies of the free regional newspaper Capital City Weekly.

Featured in media

Skagway and the surrounding goldfields in 1897-8 is the main setting for George Markstein's 1978 novel 'Tara Kane′, which also features fictionalised versions of Jefferson 'Soapy' Smith and his gang, along with photographer Eric A. Hegg (called Ernst Hart in the novel).

In the Three Stooges short In the Sweet Pie and Pie, Skagway receives a humorous mention: "Edam Neckties, with three convenient locations: Skagway, Alaska; Little America; and Pago Pago."

Skagway is a featured setting in the 1946 film Road to Utopia, starring Bob Hope and Bing Crosby.

In Jack London's short story "The Unexpected," the main characters spend the winter of 1897–98 in "the mushroom outfitting-town of Skaguay" before moving on to stake a gold-mining claim elsewhere.

Skagway is featured in the 1955 Western The Far Country, directed by Anthony Mann.

Skagway is a town featured in the computer game The Yukon Trail.

Skagway and the surrounding region is a campaign available in a modification of the helicopter combat simulator "Enemy Engaged: Comanche vs. Hokum" (version 1.16.0)

In an episode of Homeland Security USA, the border crossing in Skagway was featured as being the least-used crossing in the United States.

Chief Inspector Fenwick often dryly referred to nearby "big city" "Skagway" when sending his mounty, Dudley Do-Right, to capture the show's evil nemesis, Snidely Whiplash.

Skagway's Mo Mountain Mutts came to prominence in 2023 when its "puppy bus" video went viral.

Health care
Skagway is served by Dahl Memorial Clinic, the only primary health clinic in the area. The facility is usually staffed by 3 Advanced Nurse Practitioners and 3 Medical Assistants and is open Monday through Friday year-round with limited Saturday hours during summer. The clinic also operates after hours in emergency situations. The borough is also served 24/7 by local EMS. Individuals in need of dire medical attention are transported by air via helicopter or air ambulance to Bartlett Regional Hospital in Juneau (an approximately 45 minute flight). Whitehorse General Hospital in Whitehorse, Yukon is the nearest hospital to Skagway that is accessible by road (an approximately 2 hour drive).

References

External links

 The Municipality of Skagway Borough
 Skagway Chamber of Commerce
 Skagway Convention & Visitors Bureau
 Skagway-Hoonah-Angoon Census Area map, 2000 census: Alaska Department of Labor
 Borough map, 2000 census: Alaska Department of Labor
 Borough map, 2010 census: Alaska Department of Labor
 The Skagway News local newspaper
 Soapy Smith Preservation Trust
 Alaska Community Database Community Information Summaries
 University of Washington Libraries Digital Collections – Eric A. Hegg Photographs 736 photographs from 1897 to 1901 documenting the Klondike and Alaska gold rushes, including depictions of frontier life in Skagway and Nome, Alaska and Dawson, Yukon Territory. Keyword search on "Skagway".
 ”Skagway: Gateway to the Klondike”, a National Park Service Teaching with Historic Places (TwHP) lesson plan
 

1897 establishments in Alaska
Alaska boroughs
Boot Hill cemeteries
Census-designated places in Alaska
Former cities in Alaska
Klondike Gold Rush
Mining communities in Alaska
 
Populated coastal places in Alaska on the Pacific Ocean
Populated places established in 1897